Brigitte Senglaub (born 1 March 1958) is a Swiss sprinter. She competed in the women's 100 metres at the 1980 Summer Olympics.

References

External links
 

1958 births
Living people
Athletes (track and field) at the 1980 Summer Olympics
Swiss female sprinters
Olympic athletes of Switzerland
Place of birth missing (living people)
Olympic female sprinters